The 2020–21 New York Cosmos season was the new Cosmos' sixth season of professional play and first playing in the National Independent Soccer Association. Including the previous franchise, it was the 20th season of a club entitled New York Cosmos playing professional soccer in the New York metropolitan area.

New York finished 3rd in the Eastern Conference during the NISA Fall Season before failing to advance out of the group stage of the Fall Championship. Prior to the Spring Season, the team announced it would be going on hiatus.

Background 

In the Cosmos final season in the North American Soccer League, the team earned a 10–15–7 combined regular season record and qualified for the playoffs as a fourth seed. In the Soccer Bowl playoffs, the Cosmos defeated Spring and Fall regular season champion Miami FC in the semifinals via penalty kick shootout. On November 12, 2017, the team lost to the San Francisco Deltas, 2–0, in Soccer Bowl 2017.

Following the USSF's decision to deny the NASL division 2 sanctioning and the subsequent cancelation of the 2018 season, the Cosmos organization moved players and staff to the New York Cosmos B. This reserve team had already been playing within the semi-professional National Premier Soccer League, which was governed by the United States Adult Soccer Association, and had won its national title during its inaugural season in 2015. For the next two seasons using a mix of first team and reserve players, Cosmos B, playing games at both Mitchel Athletic Complex and Rocco B. Commisso Soccer Stadium, finished the regular season first in the North Atlantic Conference and won the conference playoff championship both times. In 2019, the team qualified for the NPSL National Championship but fell to fellow NASL cast-off Miami FC, 3–1, at Mitchell. The team also qualified for both the 2018 and 2019 U.S. Open Cup tournaments, the former being through special permission, and reached the Play-In and Second Rounds in each respectively.

In 2019, the team attempted to rejoin the professional ranks within the NPSL's proposed professional league along with ten other teams. However, this never came to be and the originally titled "Founder's Cup," set to be a precursor tournament to the league, was renamed to the NPSL Member's Cup with the Cosmos first team taking part along with five others including Chattanooga FC and Detroit City FC. The Cosmos finished second in the competition behind Detroit City. In June of that year, team owner Rocco B. Commisso completed the purchase of Serie A side ACF Fiorentina.

In addition, the team also hosted 2. Bundesliga side FC St. Pauli on May 23, beating the German side, 2–1, at Columbia University.

On November 21, 2019, the Cosmos were announced as the newest member of the National Independent Soccer Association with plans to begin play the following year.

Club

Roster 

|-

Coaching staff

Transfers

In

Out

Loan in

Loan out

Competitions

NISA Independent Cup 

The Cosmos were announced as one of the four NISA teams taking part in the inaugural NISA Independent Cup on July 1. The regional tournament is set to act as both a pre-season and chance to "provide a platform for professional and amateur independent clubs to play together on a national stage."

New York was drawn into the Mid-Atlantic Region alongside fellow NISA expansion side New Amsterdam FC, Fall 2019 UPSL champion Maryland Bobcats FC, and NPSL side FC Baltimore Christos.

On July 24, NISA announced that the Mid-Atlantic Region tournament was postponed due to a surge of COVID-19 cases in Maryland and the subsequent closing of the Maryland SoccerPlex to professional sports. On July 28, NISA announced a majority of the region's games would be played at Evergreen Sportsplex in Leesburg, Virginia with the sole exception being the Cosmos opening match against New Amsterdam on August 2, which was played at Hudson Sports Complex in Warwick, New York.

Standings

Matches

NISA Fall Season 

On June 4, NISA announced that details for the 2020 Fall Season. The nine member teams would be split into conferences, Eastern and Western, with the Cosmos playing in the former. The team is set to play eight regular season games against the rest of the eastern teams.

Details for the Fall regular season were announced on July 31, 2020. The Cosmos will take part as a member of the Eastern Conference.

Standings

Results summary

Matches

Fall Playoffs

All eight NISA teams qualified for the 2020 Fall tournament, which will be hosted at Keyworth Stadium in Detroit, Michigan, beginning on September 21 ending with the final on October 2. The New York Cosmos were drawn into Group B of the two group tournament. Going into their final match, the Cosmos needed to win by five or more goals to advance to the Fall Semi-Finals. They failed to do so, and were eliminated when they lost 2 - 1.

Group stage

NISA Spring Season 

On January 29, 2021, the Cosmos announced that the team would be pausing operations due to the COVID-19 pandemic.

U.S. Open Cup 

The Cosmos went on hiatus prior to the U.S. Open Cup draw.

Squad statistics

Appearances and goals

|-
|colspan="14"|Players who appeared for the New York Cosmos who are no longer at the club:

|-
|}

Goal scorers

Disciplinary record

References 

New York Cosmos (2010–) seasons
New York Cosmos
Cosmos
New York Cosmos
Cosmos